Cl6b (μ-THTX-Cl6b) is a peptide toxin from the venom of the spider Cyriopagopus longipes. It acts as a sodium channel blocker: Cl6b significantly and persistently reduces currents through the tetrodotoxin-sensitive sodium channels NaV1.2-1.4, NaV1.6, and NaV1.7.

Structure

The Cl6b peptide has a molecular weight of 3708.9 Da. It contains 33 amino acid residues, among which six cysteines that engage in three disulfide bonds to form a structural motif known as an inhibitor cystine knot (ICK). This structure grants stability to the toxin and has been identified previously in other spider peptide toxins that share high sequence similarity to Cl6b.

Family
Simultaneously with the isolation of Cl6b, another peptide toxin known as Cl6a was characterized from the same spider species. The two Cl6 peptides share a sequence identity of 78.8%, including the six cysteines that make both peptides adopt the ICK motif.

Target

Cl6b acts as a selective sodium channel blocker.

Source in nature

Cl6b has been isolated from Cyriopagopus longipes, an Asian spider mainly found in Thailand, Cambodia, Laos, and China.

Activity mechanism

Cl6b significantly reduces currents through the tetrodotoxin-sensitive sodium channels NaV1.2, NaV1.3, NaV1.4, NaV1.6, and NaV1.7, with no effect on the tetrodotoxin-resistant sodium channels NaV1.5, NaV1.8, NaV1.9. Cl6b exhibits a particularly high affinity to NaV1.7 channels, which are present in great numbers in nociceptors (pain neurons) located at the dorsal root ganglion. The activity of Cl6b on NaV1.7 has similar characteristics compared to previously reported NaV1.7-peptide inhibitors, such as HWTX-IV., as Cl6b binds to the domain II segments three and four, which are part of the domain's voltage sensor. The binding is high-affinity (half-maximal inhibitory concentration (IC50) 18.80 ± 2.4 nM). It is also irreversible, which poises it as a candidate for the development of long-term in-vivo analgesia.

References 

Neurotoxins
Spider toxins
Sodium channel blockers
Ion channel toxins